Garrard is a surname. Notable people with the surname include:

Charles Garrard, New Zealand cricketer and schoolteacher
David Garrard, American football quarterback
David Garrard (property developer), British property developer
James Garrard, Governor of Kentucky
Kenner Garrard, American Civil War general
Lewis Hector Garrard, American author
Luke Garrard, English soccer player
Theophilus T. Garrard, American Civil War general
William George Garrard, New Zealand rugby union official
Wilson Garrard, New Zealand cricketer and lawyer
William L. Garrard, Professor Emeritus (Retired 2017), Aerospace Engineering & Mechanics 
Mary Garrard, American art historian and emerita professor at American University
Graeme Garrard, Canadian professor of political thought at Cardiff University

See also
Apsley Cherry-Garrard, English explorer of Antarctica 
Charles Garrard,